A Portuguese Goodbye is a 1986 Portuguese drama film directed and produced by João Botelho. The film stars Isabel de Castro, Ruy Furtado, Maria Cabral, Fernando Heitor and Cristina Hauser in the lead roles.

Cast
 Isabel de Castro
 Ruy Furtado
 Maria Cabral
 Fernando Heitor
 Cristina Hauser
 Henrique Viana
 João Perry
 António Peixoto

References

External links
 

1980s Portuguese-language films
1986 films
1986 drama films
Films shot in Portugal
Films set in Portugal
Portuguese drama films